Ekaterina Makarova and Bruno Soares were the defending champions, but Makarova decided not to participate. Soares played with Anabel Medina Garrigues, but lost to Abigail Spears and Santiago González in the semifinals.

Andrea Hlaváčková and Max Mirnyi won the title, defeating Spears and González in the final, 7–6(7–5), 6–3.

Seeds

Draw

Finals

Top half

Bottom half

References

External links
2013 US Open – Doubles draws and results at the International Tennis Federation

Mixed Doubles
US Open - Mixed Doubles
US Open - Mixed Doubles
US Open (tennis) by year – Mixed doubles